The Candidate is a 1980 West German documentary film directed by Volker Schlöndorff, Stefan Aust, Alexander Kluge and . It competed in the Un Certain Regard section at the 1980 Cannes Film Festival.

Plot summary

Appearances
 Wolf Biermann
 Karl Carstens
 Edmund Stoiber
 Franz Josef Strauß
 Marianne Strauß

References

External links
 
 
 

1980 films
1980 documentary films
West German films
1980s German-language films
German documentary films
Films directed by Alexander Kluge
Films directed by Volker Schlöndorff
Documentary films about elections
1980s German films